Marc Barthel (also known as Jesse D'Lane) is a singer, actor, songwriter and dubbing actor from Berlin, Germany. He was one of the lead members of the pop group 'Part Six'. He left the group in 2007 to focus on his solo music career as 'Jesse D'Lane'. Furthermore, he has since then been working as an actor in television, film and commercial productions.

References

External links
Marc Barthel / Jesse D'Lane - IMDB.de
Marc Barthel - Official Website
Jesse D'Lane - Official Website

1989 births
Living people
21st-century German male singers